Symphyotrichum chilense (formerly Aster chilensis) is a species of flowering plant in the family Asteraceae known by the common names Pacific aster and common California aster. It is native to the west coast of North America from British Columbia to Southern California and the Channel Islands. It grows in many habitats, especially along the coast and in the coastal mountain ranges. Despite its scientific name, it does not occur in Chile. Pacific aster blooms from June to October with violet ray florets surrounding yellow disk florets.

Description

The sparsely hairy leaves are narrowly oval-shaped, pointed, and sometimes finely serrated along the edges. The inflorescence holds flower heads that open June–October with centers of  yellow disk florets surrounded by  narrow violet ray florets. The fruit is a seed, specifically a rounded, hairy cypsela with pappi.

Distribution and habitat
Pacific aster is native to west coast provinces and states of North America in British Columbia; California, including Southern California and the Channel Islands; Oregon; and, Washington.  Despite its scientific name, it does not occur in Chile.

Citations

References

External links

chilense
Flora of the West Coast of the United States
Flora of British Columbia
Flora of California
Flora of Oregon
Flora of the Klamath Mountains
Natural history of the California chaparral and woodlands
Natural history of the California Coast Ranges
Natural history of the Channel Islands of California
Natural history of the San Francisco Bay Area
Natural history of the Santa Monica Mountains
Natural history of the Transverse Ranges
Plants described in 1832
Taxa named by Christian Gottfried Daniel Nees von Esenbeck